The 2000 UTEP Miners football team represented the University of Texas at El Paso in the 2000 NCAA Division I-A football season. The team's head coach was Gary Nord. The Miners played their home games at the Sun Bowl Stadium in El Paso, Texas.

During the 2000 season Brian Natkin became the first, and so far only, unanimous All-American in UTEP football history.

Schedule

Roster

References

UTEP
UTEP Miners football seasons
Western Athletic Conference football champion seasons
UTEP Miners football